Yanick Paternotte (born 24 December 1951 in Nancy, France) was a member of the National Assembly of France, representing the Val-d'Oise department, from 2007 to 2012, as a member of the Union for a Popular Movement.

He was the mayor of Sannois from 1983 to 2014.

References

1951 births
Living people
Politicians from Nancy, France
Republican Party (France) politicians
Union for French Democracy politicians
Union for a Popular Movement politicians
Deputies of the 13th National Assembly of the French Fifth Republic